Walter Wood may refer to:

 Walter Wood (athlete) (1914–1972), American Olympic athlete
 Walter Wood (freestyle skier) (born 1992), American freestyle skier
 Walter Wood (producer) (1921–2010), American film producer
 Walter Wood (Scouting) (1876–1981), Canadian active in the Boy Scouts
 Walter A. Wood (1815–1892), New York politician
 Walter Bertram Wood (1898–1917), World War I flying ace
 Walter W. Wood (1894–1980), American football player and a football, basketball, and baseball coach
 Walter Quarry Wood, Scottish surgeon
 Walter Childs Wood, American surgeon, state legislator, and trustee of the University of Connecticut

See also
 Walter Woods (disambiguation)
 Wallace Wood